The 2012 Big 12 Conference baseball tournament will be held at Chickasaw Bricktown Ballpark in Oklahoma City, OK from May 23rd to May 27th, 2012.  The tournament will continue the format reinstated with the 2011 tournament, consisting of two separate four-team double-elimination tournaments. The winners of each of those tournaments will face each other in a one-game match for the championship. Missouri defeated Oklahoma in the championship game, 8-7, to earn the Big 12 Conference's automatic bid to the 2012 NCAA Division I baseball tournament.

It was Missouri's first, and only, Big 12 Conference Baseball Tournament title, as they moved to the SEC on July 1, 2012.

Format and seeding
The top eight teams (based on conference results) from the conference earn invites to the tournament.

Bracket

All-Tournament Team
Source:

References

Tournament
Big 12 Conference Baseball Tournament
Big 12 Conference baseball tournament
Big 12 Conference baseball tournament
Baseball competitions in Oklahoma City
College sports tournaments in Oklahoma